Muhammed Abdul Hakkim Azhari (also called as MAH Al Kandi) is an Indian Islamic scholar and educationalist, who serves as the Director of the Jamia Markaz. He is the managing director of the Markaz Knowledge City, and the General Secretary of the Sunni Yuvjan Sangham (Sunni Youth Society) and the rector of Jamia Madeenathunnoor, Poonoor.

Early life and education
Abdul Hakim Azhari is the son of Islamic scholar Kanthapuram A. P. Aboobacker Musliyar. He studied at the Al-Azhar University in Cairo, Babasaheb Bhimrao Ambedkar Bihar University, in Bihar and the Markazu Saqafathi Sunniyya in Kerala.

Career
Azhari has established social and educational institutions in various parts of India. In 2001, he established Jamia Madeenathunnoor in Poonoor, Kozhikode. He announced to establish a hundred schools in Uttar Pradesh with a focus on primary education. He serves as the rector of Markazu Saqafathi Sunniyya, a famous Islamic institute in Kerala.
He speaks on Islam, education, democracy and human rights. He is also associated with Sunni Students Federation, a students body of Sufi Sunni Muslims.

Azhari also serves as the managing director of Markaz Knowledge City, a residential and educational hub near Kozhikode city. He supervised the establishment of Alif Global school. He reportedly said in a conference that, '"Islam must be preached in most tolerant manner. Our duty is to spread this message of Islam to save humanity from darkness."

See also
Syed Babar Ashraf

References

Living people
Indian Muslims
People from Kozhikode district
Indian Sunni Muslim scholars of Islam
Indian Sufis
Indian spiritual teachers
Islamic religious leaders
Markaz
Leaders of Samastha (AP Faction)
Al-Azhar University alumni
Babasaheb Bhimrao Ambedkar Bihar University alumni
21st-century Indian Muslims
Year of birth missing (living people)